Pterolophia jiriensis is a species of beetle in the family Cerambycidae. It was described by Mikhail Leontievich Danilevsky in 1996. It is known from South Korea.

References

jiriensis
Beetles described in 1996